Khaled Dakheel Al-Enezi (born 10 October 1984) is a Saudi professional footballer who plays as a midfielder .

References

External links
 

1984 births
Living people
Saudi Arabian footballers
Al Batin FC players
Saudi First Division League players
Saudi Professional League players
Saudi Second Division players
Saudi Fourth Division players
People from Eastern Province, Saudi Arabia
Association football midfielders